Manuel Archibald Lujan Sr. (May 21, 1893 – June 5, 1975) was an American politician from the state of New Mexico. A Republican, he served as mayor of Santa Fe, New Mexico from 1942 until 1948.

Biography
Lujan was born in San Ildefonso Pueblo, New Mexico in 1893, to Martin Lujan and Zenaida Sanchez. In 1942, he took office as mayor of Santa Fe, and served until 1948. Lujan unsuccessfully ran for the United States House of Representatives in 1944. In 1948, he was the Republican nominee for Governor of New Mexico. He lost to incumbent Democrat Thomas J. Mabry and received 45% of the vote.

Personal life
Lujan's wife was Lorenzita Romero. He was the father of Manuel Lujan Jr., who served 20 years as a U.S. Representative and then as United States Secretary of the Interior under George H. W. Bush from 1989 until 1993. He was also a great-granduncle of Michelle Lujan Grisham, the incumbent Governor of New Mexico since 2019 and who also served as a U.S. Representative for six years.

References

External links
 

1893 births
1975 deaths
20th-century American politicians
American politicians of Mexican descent
Hispanic and Latino American mayors
Lujan family
Mayors of Santa Fe, New Mexico
New Mexico Republicans
People from San Ildefonso Pueblo, New Mexico